Urocystis is a genus of smut fungi containing plant pathogens, which infect grass species and other plants.

Selected species of Urocystis 
 Urocystis agropyri
 Urocystis arxanensis infects Elymus spp.
 Urocystis brassicae infects Brassica spp
 Urocystis occulta
 Urocystis tritici, Wheat flag smut, synonym of Urocystis agropyri
 Urocystis tranzscheliana infects Primula sieboldii
 Urocystis xilinhotensis infects Bromus spp.

Species

Urocystis achnatheri
Urocystis agropyri
Urocystis agropyri-campestris
Urocystis agropyri-juncei
Urocystis agrostidis
Urocystis alaskana
Urocystis allii
Urocystis alopecuri
Urocystis alstroemeriae
Urocystis americana
Urocystis andina
Urocystis anemones
Urocystis anemones-narcissiflorae
Urocystis antarctica
Urocystis antipolitana
Urocystis antucensis
Urocystis aquilegiae
Urocystis arjonae
Urocystis arrhenatheri
Urocystis arxanensis
Urocystis asphodeli
Urocystis atragenes
Urocystis atropidis
Urocystis aurea
Urocystis avenae-elatioris
Urocystis avenastri
Urocystis beckmanniae
Urocystis beckwithiae
Urocystis behboudii
Urocystis beijingensis
Urocystis bolboschoeni
Urocystis bolivarii
Urocystis bomareae
Urocystis bornmuelleri
Urocystis brassicae
Urocystis bromi
Urocystis bulbigera
Urocystis bulbinellae
Urocystis bulbocodii
Urocystis calamagrostidis
Urocystis callianthemi
Urocystis camassiae
Urocystis carcinodes
Urocystis caricis
Urocystis castellana
Urocystis cepulae
Urocystis ceratocephali
Urocystis chifengensis
Urocystis cholerae
Urocystis cholerae-asiaticae
Urocystis chorizandrae
Urocystis circaeasteri
Urocystis clintoniae
Urocystis colchici
Urocystis colchici-lutei
Urocystis coralloides
Urocystis corsica
Urocystis cortusae
Urocystis corydalis
Urocystis curculiginis
Urocystis dactylidina
Urocystis delphinii
Urocystis deschampsiae
Urocystis destruens
Urocystis dioscoreae
Urocystis dunhuangensis
Urocystis elymi
Urocystis eranthidis
Urocystis eriospermi
Urocystis erythronii
Urocystis ferrarisiana
Urocystis festucae
Urocystis ficariae
Urocystis filipendulae
Urocystis fischeri
Urocystis floccosa
Urocystis flowersii
Urocystis fraseri
Urocystis gageae
Urocystis galanthi
Urocystis giliae
Urocystis glabella
Urocystis gladioli
Urocystis gladiolicola
Urocystis granulosa
Urocystis hederae
Urocystis helanensis
Urocystis helvetica
Urocystis herteriana
Urocystis heucherae
Urocystis hierochloae
Urocystis hieronymi
Urocystis hispanica
Urocystis hordei
Urocystis hordeicola
Urocystis hypoxidis
Urocystis intestinalis
Urocystis irregularis
Urocystis ixiolirii
Urocystis jaapiana
Urocystis japonica
Urocystis johansonii
Urocystis junci
Urocystis juncophila
Urocystis kmetiana
Urocystis koeleriae
Urocystis komarovii
Urocystis lagerheimii
Urocystis leersiae
Urocystis leimbachii
Urocystis leucoji
Urocystis libyca
Urocystis lithophragmatis
Urocystis littoralis
Urocystis luzulae
Urocystis lybica
Urocystis macrospora
Urocystis macularis
Urocystis mayorii
Urocystis melicae
Urocystis miyabeana
Urocystis monotropae
Urocystis multispora
Urocystis murashkinskyi
Urocystis muscaridis
Urocystis mustaphae
Urocystis narcissi
Urocystis nevodovskyi
Urocystis nivalis
Urocystis novae-zelandiae
Urocystis oblonga
Urocystis occulta
Urocystis ornithogali
Urocystis ornithoglossi
Urocystis orobanches
Urocystis oryzae
Urocystis oryzopsidis
Urocystis oxalidis
Urocystis oxygraphidis
Urocystis pacifica
Urocystis paraquilegiae
Urocystis paridis
Urocystis pedicularis
Urocystis permagna
Urocystis phaceliae
Urocystis phalaridis
Urocystis phlei
Urocystis phlei-alpini
Urocystis picbaueri
Urocystis poae
Urocystis poae-palustris
Urocystis polygonati
Urocystis preussii
Urocystis primulae
Urocystis primulicola
Urocystis pseudoanemones
Urocystis puccinelliae
Urocystis pulsatillae
Urocystis pulsatillae-albae
Urocystis qinghaiensis
Urocystis radicicola
Urocystis ranunculi
Urocystis ranunculi-alpestris
Urocystis ranunculi-aucheri
Urocystis ranunculi-auricomi
Urocystis ranunculi-bullati
Urocystis ranunculi-lanuginosi
Urocystis rechingeri
Urocystis reinhardii
Urocystis rigida
Urocystis rodgersiae
Urocystis roivainenii
Urocystis rostrariae
Urocystis rytzii
Urocystis schizocaulon
Urocystis scilloides
Urocystis secalis-silvestris
Urocystis sichuanensis
Urocystis simplex
Urocystis sinensis
Urocystis skirgielloae
Urocystis sophiae
Urocystis sorosporioides
Urocystis sternbergiae
Urocystis stipae
Urocystis subnuda
Urocystis syncocca
Urocystis tessellata
Urocystis thaxteri
Urocystis tianschanica
Urocystis tothii
Urocystis tranzscheliana
Urocystis trautvetteriae
Urocystis trientalis
Urocystis trillii
Urocystis triseti
Urocystis tritici
Urocystis trollii
Urocystis uleana
Urocystis ulei
Urocystis ulmariae
Urocystis ungeri
Urocystis vesicaria
Urocystis violae
Urocystis vulpiae
Urocystis wangii
Urocystis xilinhotensis
Urocystis yunnanensis

References 

Fungal plant pathogens and diseases
Ustilaginomycotina